The Madagascar starling (Hartlaubius auratus) is a species of starling in the family Sturnidae. It is endemic to Madagascar.

Commonly placed in the monotypic genus Hartlaubius, the Madagascan starling is also sometimes placed in the genus Saroglossa (as Saroglossa aurata), which otherwise only contains the spot-winged starling (S. spilopterus).

References

Madagascar starling
Endemic birds of Madagascar
Madagascar starling
Taxonomy articles created by Polbot